Hannibal Penney was born in Chattanooga, Tennessee. He spent many years performing in films, Shakespearean plays and as a regular on Ryan's Hope.
He co-starred alongside William F. McGaha  in the 1972 biker film J.C. where he played the part of David Little, a black biker.

He is mostly known to TV viewers as Dr. Clem Moultrie, the tall and handsome neurosurgeon in Ryan's Hope, a role he played from 1975 to 1978.

External links

Ryan's Hope Characters (M)

Interview
 http://ryansbaronline.tripod.com/penneysod77.html

Male actors from Tennessee
Living people
Year of birth missing (living people)